Maduramicin (maduramycin) is an antiprotozoal agent used in veterinary medicine to prevent coccidiosis.  It is a natural chemical compound first isolated from the actinomycete Actinomadura rubra.

References

Antiprotozoal agents
Carboxylic acids
Secondary alcohols
Spiro compounds
Tertiary alcohols
Tetrahydrofurans
Tetrahydropyrans